is an Echizen Railway Katsuyama Eiheiji Line train station located in the town of Eiheiji, Yoshida District, Fukui Prefecture, Japan.

Lines
Between Echizenguchi and Katsuyama, trains generally pass one another at this station.

Station layout
The station consists of one island platform connected to the station building by a level crossing. The station is unattended.

Adjacent stations

History
The station was relocated approximately 300 meters west on September 1, 1955 and renamed Echizen-Takehara Station. Operations were halted from June 25, 2001. The station reopened on July 20, 2003 as an Echizen Railway station.

Surrounding area
The station faces Fukui Prefectural Route 255 and a small group of houses on the other side of the road.  Behind the station are rice fields.
Other points of interest include:
Ninki-no-Sato
Kamishii Bunka Kaikan Sun-Sun Hall
Eiheiji Municipal Library, Kamishii Branch

See also
 List of railway stations in Japan

External links

  

Railway stations in Fukui Prefecture
Railway stations in Japan opened in 1914
Katsuyama Eiheiji Line
Eiheiji, Fukui